Stavro Jabra, (February 18, 1947 – March 12, 2017), was a Lebanese cartoonist and illustrator, better known as Stavro.  His work reflected the current events in Lebanon, the Middle East and the world in general. For forty years, his cartoons about topical news in Lebanon and the Middle East were printed in Lebanese newspapers. His work was also published in international newspapers such as in Der Spiegel, Jeune Afrique, Le Monde, Le Courrier International and the New York Times.

Cartoons books
 1971 : CARICATURES STAVRO
 1974: LA GUERRE DU PETROLE
 1978: STAVROSCOPE 1975 – 76 – 77
 1979: STAVROSCOPE 78
 1979: DES SEINS CON LIT
 1980: LIBAN MON HUMOUR
 1982: VIE ET MORT SANS LEGENDE (LIBAN)
 1982: COLOMBES DE GUERRE (LIBAN)
 1982 : MUR DU SANG
 1985: DOLLARMES
 1987: STARFACE
 1989: SOURIEZ A LA SYRIE NOIRE
 1989: SAM SUFFIT LA SYRIE
 1991: LES SAIGNEURS DE LA GUERRE
 1992: RAQUEL MADE IN LEBANON
 1992: L'AN PIRE' 92
 1993: YA SALAM
 1996: STAVRO TRAIT SPECIAL
 1997: FEMMES A CROQUER
 2007: VIVRE LEBNAN IN CARTOONS

References

1947 births
2017 deaths
Lebanese cartoonists
Lebanese caricaturists
Lebanese editorial cartoonists
Lebanese illustrators